Nymphicula nokensis is a moth in the family Crambidae. It was described by David John Lawrence Agassiz in 2014. It is found in Irian Jaya in New Guinea.

The wingspan is about 10 mm. The base of the forewings is fuscous with a white antemedian fascia. The median area is scattered with brownish scales. The base of the hindwings is brown, with a white subbasal fascia and a fuscous line.

Etymology
The species name refers to the Peninsula Nok, the type location.

References

Nymphicula
Moths described in 2014